Live on Tape is a late night comedy sketch show that aired on Saturday nights at 10pm on KLJB-TV in Davenport, Iowa from 1987 to 1989, and repeated through 1990. It was the only locally produced entertainment show at that time in the Quad Cities area.

Live on Tape was a locally produced, low budget show, featuring characters such as E.J. Crackerhorn, Arnie Upshoe, Guy Newswarthy, Uncle Joey, Nosey, Clive Knobfinder, Zippy Spamhammer, Bongo the Exploding Clown, and plenty more.

Much of the humor poked fun at local and national personalities, spoofed commercials and TV shows, but also included silly adventures of the show's cast of regular characters—be that sending them through a black hole after a stockpile of powerful hairspray goes nuclear and blasts them into space, or bombing Kewanee, Illinois with Mallo Cups in a failed attempt to keep Cosmonauts Ivan Drombollo and Voster Slepenski from taking over the air-waves.

Cast members
  Thomas Hart
  John (Janos) Horvath 
  Don Abbott 
  Brandon Lovested 
  Merlin Nelson Jr. 
  Pete Calderone 
  Monta Ponsetto 
  Scott Hoyt 
  Jim Peterson 
  Mike Carron 
  Jennifer Hanson 
  Larry Brennan 
  Brad Hauskins 
  Leann Donovan
  Barb Engstrom 
  Patti Flaherty 
  Pat Flaherty 
  Scott Tunnicliff 
  Greg Baldwin 
  Lora Adams 
  Denise Hollmer 
  Donny Bargmann Jr. 
  John Bain

References

External links
 "Live on Tape" official website
 "Live on Tape" blog
 "Live on Tape" episode archive

Local comedy television series in the United States
1987 American television series debuts
1989 American television series endings
1980s American sketch comedy television series
1980s American satirical television series
English-language television shows